In general relativity and differential geometry, the Bel–Robinson tensor is a tensor defined in the abstract index notation by:

Alternatively,

where  is the Weyl tensor.  It was introduced by Lluís Bel in 1959. The Bel–Robinson tensor is constructed from the Weyl tensor in a manner analogous to the way the electromagnetic stress–energy tensor is built from the electromagnetic tensor. Like the electromagnetic stress–energy tensor, the Bel–Robinson tensor is totally symmetric and traceless:

In general relativity, there is no unique definition of the local energy of the gravitational field. The Bel–Robinson tensor is a possible definition for local energy, since it can be shown that whenever the Ricci tensor vanishes (i.e. in vacuum), the Bel–Robinson tensor is divergence-free:

References

Tensors in general relativity
Differential geometry